Nana Aba Anamoah (born June 19, 1980) is a Ghanaian Media personality. Until her resignation from TV3, she presented the news and hosted top shows including The Divas Show. She is currently the General Manager of GHOne TV and Starr 103.5 FM. She is also ambassador for women football in Ghana.

Anamoah is a member of the Women's Premier League committee in Ghana. She's also a football fanatic who supports Manchester United and Accra Great Olympics.

Education 
Anamoah is a product of Ghana National College and has a background in Development Finance from the University of Ghana Business School. She's taken up Executive Education courses including one in 21st Century Leadership from the Harvard Kennedy School (Harvard University).

Awards 
TV Personality of the Year, RTP Awards (2017, 2019).
TV Personality (Female), Glitz Africa Awards 2018.
TV News Anchor of the Year (2004, 2008, 2012, 2017). 
 TV Development Show Host of the Year, RTP Awards 2018.
Excellence in Media Honors at the Ghana Women of the Year Honors 2019.

Personal life 
Nana Aba Anamoah is a Catholic. She is a mother of one, a son Jyotir, who lives and schools in United States. She is also known for her charitable endeavors; on 25 January 2022, she launched Hearts Wide Open, a foundation established to serve as a support system for those in need of funding for medical emergencies, school fees etc.

References 

Living people
Ghanaian television journalists
Ghanaian women journalists
Ghana Institute of Management and Public Administration alumni
1978 births
Ghanaian radio journalists
Ghana National College alumni